Orsidis is a genus of longhorn beetles of the subfamily Lamiinae, containing the following species:

 Orsidis acutipennis Breuning, 1938
 Orsidis andamanensis Breuning, 1958
 Orsidis flavosticticus Breuning, 1938
 Orsidis privatus (Pascoe, 1866)
 Orsidis proletarius (Pascoe, 1858)
 Orsidis singaporensis Breuning, 1979

References

Lamiini